A Georgian name consists of a given name and a surname used by ethnic Georgians.

Given names
According to the Public Service Hall the most common Georgian names are:

Males: Giorgi, Davit, Zurab, Levan, Aleksandre, Irakli, Mikheil, Tamaz, Nikoloz and Avtandil. 

Females: Nino, Tamar, Mariam, Maia, Nana, Ketevan, Natela, Manana, Natia and Ana.

Surnames

Georgian surnames are derived either from patronymics or, less frequently, from toponyms, with addition of various suffixes.

Georgian suffixes vary by region. The most common Georgian suffixes are:

 -shvili (-შვილი): meaning "child": from western and eastern Georgia. E.g. Baratashvili, Andronikashvili, Guramishvili, etc.
 -dze (-ძე): meaning "son": from western and eastern Georgia. E.g. Abashidze, Arveladze, Kaladze, etc.
 -eli (-ელი): meaning "from (place)": from eastern and western Georgia. E.g. Jaqeli, Tsereteli, Amashukeli, etc.
 -uri and -uli (-ური) and (-ული): from mountainous eastern Georgia. E.g. Donauri, Burduli, etc.
 -ani (-ანი): Svan surname from mountainous western Georgia. E.g. Dadeshkeliani, Dadiani, Kipiani, etc.
 -ia, -ua, -ava and -iri (-ია), (-უა), (-ავა) and (-ირი): Mingrelian surname from western Georgia. E.g. Abakelia, Chichua, Gvazava, Mujiri, etc.
 -shi (-ში): Laz surname from western Georgia. E.g. Tugushi, Khalvashi, Jashi, etc.
 -khi (-ხი): from southern Georgia. E.g. Meskhi, Lashkhi, etc.
 -kva (-ყვა): from western Georgia. E.g. Ingorokva, Rokva, etc.
 -ioni (-იონი): from eastern and western Georgia. E.g. Bagrationi, Kimerioni, etc.
 -ti (-ტი): from western Georgia. E.g. Glonti, Jgenti, Jibuti, Kiuti etc.

The first recorded Georgian surnames date to the 7th–8th century. They were mostly toponymic in nature (such as Surameli, Machabeli etc.), patronymic, or derived from the profession, social status, position, or title, which was hereditary in the family (such as Amilakhvari, Amirejibi, Eristavi etc.). Beginning from the 13th century, the surnames became more frequently based upon patronymics, a tradition which became almost universal in the 17th–18th century. Some of the Georgian surnames indicate ethnicity or regional origin of the family, and are also generated as patronymics. Examples are Kartvelishvili ("child of Kartveli", i.e., Georgian), Megrelishvili ("child of Megreli", i.e., Mingrelian), Cherkezishvili ("child of Cherkezi", i.e., Circassian), Abkhazishvili ("child of Abkhazi", i.e., Abkhazian), Somkhishvili ("child of Somekhi", i.e., Armenian), Berdzenishvili ("child of Berdzeni", i.e., Greek), Prangishvili ("child of Prangi", i.e., French).    

There are some very rare Georgian surnames like Jolbordi, Galogre, Lapachi, Molodini, Shermadini, Sivsive, Gverdtsiteli, Megvinetukhutsesi etc.

According to the Public Service Hall the most common Georgian surnames are: Beridze, Kapanadze, Gelashvili, Maisuradze, Giorgadze, Lomidze, Tsiklauri, Bolkvadze, Kvaratskhelia and Nozadze.

References

 
 
Names by culture